Dakshini Nanda Devi Glacier is a glacier in Chamoli district, Uttarakhand, India. With Uttari Nanda Devi Glacier, Dakshini Nanda Devi Glacier flanks Nanda Devi peak and also feeds the Rishiganga river. Nanda Khat is also near.

See also
 Nanda Devi National Park
 Rishi Pahar
 2021 Uttarakhand flood

References

External links and references
 A Youtube video on glaciers in India, not in English

Glaciers of Uttarakhand
Glaciers of the Himalayas